was a Japanese explorer of Central Asia. He made two trips to Central Asia between 1902 and 1910, all financed by Count Ōtani. Although he travelled as a secretary of Otani's Buddhist temple in Kyoto, he was suspected, correctly, by British and Russian Intelligence of being in the Imperial Japanese Army.

References
 Hopkirk, Peter (1980). Foreign Devils on the Silk Road: The Search for the Lost Cities and Treasures of Chinese Central Asia. Amherst: The University of Massachusetts Press. .

For more details of Nomura's expeditions, see Expeditions of Count Otani.

Japanese explorers
Explorers of Central Asia
Imperial Japanese Army personnel